Robert Evans (born 14 April 1992) is a Welsh international rugby union player. He plays at prop for the Dragons. He previously played for the Scarlets

Rugby career
Evans made his regional debut for the Scarlets during the 2012–13 season, coming on as a substitute against Sale Sharks in the LV Cup. He had previously played for Carmarthen Quins in the Welsh Premier Division.

International

Evans has been a Wales Under-20s international, and helped the team reach third place in the 2012 IRB Junior World Championship in South Africa, playing in the front row alongside fellow Scarlets Kirby Myhill and Samson Lee.

In November 2013, Evans was called into the senior Wales squad for the Autumn international matches.

On 20 January 2015, Evans was named in the 34-man Wales squad for the 2015 Six Nations Championship, making his debut as a half time replacement in the win against Ireland.

International tries

References

1992 births
Living people
Rugby union players from Haverfordwest
Scarlets players
Wales international rugby union players
Welsh rugby union players
Rugby union props
Dragons RFC players